Cloiselia is a genus of flowering plants belonging to the family Asteraceae.

Its native range is Madagascar.

Species:

Cloiselia carbonaria 
Cloiselia humbertii 
Cloiselia madagascariensis 
Cloiselia oleifolia

References

Asteraceae
Asteraceae genera